Types & Shadows is the third studio album by Christian metal band Wolves at the Gate. The album was produced by Will Putney, and released on November 4, 2016, by Solid State Records.

Release
On September 15, 2016, Wolves at the Gate released the single "Flickering Flame", and later on September 30, they released "Asleep". They released the final single, "War in the Time of Peace" for their third studio album, Types & Shadows, which was released on November 4, 2016, by Solid State Records.

Reception
Types & Shadows received generally positive reviews, with Joshua Olson of Indie Vision Music saying that "Types & Shadows shows Wolves At The Gate reaching the peak of the sonic abilities they’ve shown throughout their career."

Track listing
All songs written and composed by Steve Cobucci

Personnel 
Wolves at the Gate
Steve Cobucci – guitar, clean vocals, piano 
Ben Summers – bass guitar, backing vocals
Nick Detty – unclean vocals
Abishai Collingsworth – drums 

Additional personnel

 Adam Skatula – A&R 
 Eric Powell - booking
 Steve Seid – engineer 
 Brandon Ebel – executive production
 Cory Hadje – management 
 Randy LeBoeuf - production, engineering
 Steve Cobucci - production, engineering
 Will Putney – production, engineering

Charts

References

2016 albums
Solid State Records albums
Wolves at the Gate (band) albums